The Women's Road Race at the 1999 UCI Road World Championships was held on Saturday October 9, 1999, in Verona, Italy, over a total distance of 113,75 kilometres (seven laps). There were a total of 119 starters, with 93 cyclists finishing the race.

Final classification

References
Results
radsportnews

Women's Road Race
UCI Road World Championships – Women's road race
UCI